The Department of Social Services was an Australian government department that existed between April 1939 and December 1972.

The Department was established by the Menzies Government in 1939, but did not become fully operative until 1941.

Scope
Information about the department's functions and/or government funding allocation could be found in the Administrative Arrangements Orders, the annual Portfolio Budget Statements and in the Department's annual reports.

According to the Administrative Arrangements Order of 12 March 1947, the department was responsible for:
allowances for wives and children of invalid pensioners
child endowment
compassionate allowances to persons ineligible for invalid, old-age and widows' pensions and maternity allowances
compensation or pensions to, or in respect of, ex-members of the Civil Constructional Corps, ex-civil defence workers, and civilians who suffered war injury
reception and aftercare of evacuees and ex-internees
funeral benefit for invalid and old-age pensioners
maternity allowances
old-age pensions
payment of -
Commonwealth Literary Fund allowances
Financial assistance to university students
Imperial pensions (other than war pensions)
Judiciary pensions
Pensions and retiring allowances under Section 84 of the Commonwealth Constitution
Special annuities granted by the Commonwealth
Superannuation to retired Commonwealth employees
Reciprocity with New Zealand in relation to invalid and old-age benefits
Rehabilitation of ex-members of the Forces
Rehabilitation of invalid pensioners
Sickness benefits
Social service proposals and activities generally
Unemployment benefits
Vocational training of invalid pensioners and unemployment and sickness beneficiaries
Widow's pensions

Structure
The Department was an Australian Public Service department, staffed by officials who were responsible to the Minister for Social Services.

References

Social Services
Ministries established in 1939